Rudolf Kayser (* 28 November 1889 in Parchim; † 5 February 1964 in New York City) was a German literary historian.

Rudolf Kayser studied literature and received his doctorate with a thesis on Arnim and Brentano. As a young lecturer at the Berlin Lessing University he made his debut in 1918 with the essay The Intellectuals and the Spiritual. In 1919 he became editor for the publisher S. Fischer in Berlin, and from 1922 to 1933 he was senior editor of the Neue Rundschau. Erwin Piscator brought Kayser to the Volksbühne Berlin as dramaturgical advisor in the mid-1920s . In 1930 Kayser wrote a biography of his father-in-law, Albert Einstein, under the pseudonym "Anton Reiser".

Rudolf Kayser was married to Ilse (1897–1934), the stepdaughter of Albert Einstein. In 1935 he emigrated to New York and became professor of German and European literature at Brandeis University. In 1936, he married Eva Urgiss, daughter of German screenwriter and film critic Julius Urgiß.

His estate is kept in the Israel National Library.

Literature 
 Renate Heuer (Hrsg.): Lexikon deutsch-jüdischer Autoren / Archiv Bibliographia Judaica. Band 13: Jaco – Kerr. K. G. Saur, München u. a. 2005, S. 323–332.
 Wolfgang Kaelcke: Parchimer Persönlichkeiten. Teil 2, (= Schriftenreihe des Museums der Stadt Parchim. Heft 5). Museum der Stadt, Parchim 1997, .

References

External links 
 
 A Late Expressionist-Literary Critic-Literary Scholar: The Estate of Rudolf Kayser at the National Library of Israel

1889 births
1964 deaths
People from Parchim
People from the Grand Duchy of Mecklenburg-Schwerin
German literary historians
German biographers
German editors
German male non-fiction writers
Brandeis University faculty